Nationality words link to articles with information on the nation's poetry or literature (for instance, Irish or France).

Events

Works published

1147:
 Bernard Silvestris's Cosmographia presented to the Pope

Births
Death years link to the corresponding "[year] in poetry" article. There are conflicting or unreliable sources for the birth years of many people born in this period; where sources conflict, the poet is listed again and the conflict is noted:

1140:
 Beatritz de Dia (died unknown), French trobairitz (female troubadour)
 Xin Qiji (died 1207), Chinese Song Dynasty poet and military leader
 Dietmar von Aist (died 1171), an early Minnesänger (possible)

1141:
 Nizami Ganjavi (died 1209), Persian romantic epic poet

1142:
 Farid al-Din Attar (died 1221), Persian

1145:
 Ibn Jubayr (died 1217), geographer, traveler and poet from al-Andalus
 Attar Neyshapuri (died 1221), Persian Muslim poet, theoretician of Sufism, and hagiographer

1147:
 Raimbaut of Orange (died 1173), Occitan troubadour (approx.)

1149:
 Chand Bardai (died 1200), Hindu Brahmin and the court poet of the Indian king Prithviraj Chauhan

Deaths
Birth years link to the corresponding "[year] in poetry" article:

1141:
 Yehuda Halevi (born 1075), Hebrew poet in Al-Andalus

1142:
 Yue Fei (born 1103), Song
 Peter Abelard (born 1079), French, writing in Latin

1143:
 Adib Sabir (born unknown), Persian

1147:
 Jaufré Rudel (born unknown), an Occitan troubadour

1148:
 Am'aq (born 1048), Persian poet that carried the title amir al-shu'ara ("Amir of poets")
 Bernard Silvestris (born 1085), a Latin poet in France

See also

 Poetry
 12th century in poetry
 12th century in literature
 List of years in poetry

Other events:
 Other events of the 12th century
 Other events of the 13th century

12th century:
 12th century in poetry
 12th century in literature

Notes

12th-century poetry
Poetry